Sambucus australasica, commonly known as yellow elderberry, native elderberry or native elder, is a species of flowering plant in the family Adoxaceae and is endemic to eastern Australia. It is a shrub or small tree with pinnate leaves that have coarse teeth on their edges, small white flowers with three petals, and yellow fruit. It is usually found in and on the edges of rainforest.

Description

Taxonomy
Yellow elderberry was first formally described in 1838 by John Lindley who gave it the name Tripetelus australasicus and published the description in Thomas Mitchell's book, Three Expeditions into the interior of Eastern Australia. In 1891, Karl Fritsch changed the name to Sambucus australasica in Adolf Engler and Karl Anton Prantl's book Die Natürlichen Pflanzenfamilien.

Distribution and habitat
Sambucus australasica is widespread in coastal districts of Queensland and New South Wales and inland to Rylstone and Tamworth, but is rare in Victoria where it only occurs in the far north east of the state. It mostly only grows in and on the edges of rainforest.

References

australasica
Flora of New South Wales
Flora of Victoria (Australia)
Flora of Queensland
Plants described in 1838
Taxa named by John Lindley